A list of films produced in Argentina in 1998:

See also
1998 in Argentina

External links and references
 Argentine films of 1998 at the Internet Movie Database

1997
Argentine
Films